The New York City Department of Parks and Recreation, also called the Parks Department or NYC Parks, is the department of the government of New York City responsible for maintaining the city's parks system, preserving and maintaining the ecological diversity of the city's natural areas, and furnishing recreational opportunities for city's residents and visitors.

NYC Parks maintains more than 1,700 public spaces, including parks, playgrounds and recreational facilities, across the city's five boroughs. It is responsible for over 1,000 playgrounds, 800 playing fields, 550 tennis courts, 35 major recreation centers, 66 pools,  of beaches, and 13 golf courses, as well as seven nature centers, six ice skating rinks, over 2,000 greenstreets, and four major stadiums. NYC Parks also cares for park flora and fauna, community gardens, 23 historic houses, over 1,200 statues and monuments, and more than 2.5 million trees. The largest single component of parkland maintained by the department is the  Pelham Bay Park in the Bronx. Other large parks administered by NYC Parks include Central Park in Manhattan, Prospect Park in Brooklyn, Van Cortlandt Park in the Bronx, Flushing Meadows–Corona Park in Queens, and the Staten Island Greenbelt.

NYC Parks produces many special events, including concerts and movie premieres. In the summer, the busiest season, the agency organizes free carnivals and concerts, and sends mobile recreation vans to travel throughout the five boroughs providing free rental equipment for skating, baseball, and miniature golf.

The symbol of the department is a cross between the leaf of the London plane and a maple leaf. It is prominently featured on signs and buildings in public parks across the city. The London plane tree is on NYC Parks' list of restricted use species for street tree planting because it constitutes more than 10% of all street trees.

Agency
The department is a mayoral agency, headed by a commissioner who reports to the Deputy Mayor for Housing and Economic Development. The current Parks Commissioner is Susan Donoghue, who was appointed on February 4, 2022. The current chair of the New York City Council Committee on Parks & Recreation is Shekar Krishnan.

The department is allocated an expense budget and a capital budget. The expense budget covers the total expenses incurred by the agency, including salaries. The capital budget is dedicated solely for new construction projects, as well as major repairs in parks that have a useful life of more than five years and cost at least $35,000.

Its regulations are compiled in Title 56 of the New York City Rules.

History
The original Parks Commission was formed in 1856 and was responsible only for Central Park. In 1870 the Tweed Charter gave it jurisdiction for all the parks in Manhattan. In addition each borough had its independent Park Commission. A unified citywide New York City Parks Department was formed in 1934 with Robert Moses as the commissioner, a position he held until 1960. In 1968 it was reorganized as the "Parks, Recreation & Cultural Affairs Administration. In 1976 it was given its current name.

In 2001, the department underwent an investigation after the U.S. Attorney's Office received complaints from employees that they had suffered employment discrimination. The lawsuit alleged that NYC Parks violated the Civil Rights Act of 1964; according to the complaint, the NYC Parks' senior managers sought out and promoted whites to management positions without announcing job openings for those positions or conducting any formal interview processes. The complaint also said that since at least 1995, minorities have been significantly under-represented in NYC Parks' managerial ranks. In 2008, the City of New York agreed to pay a $21 million settlement to avoid going to trial.

Organization
Commissioner of the Department of Parks and Recreation
Assistant Commissioner for Agency Compliance
General Counsel
Assistant Commissioner for Community Outreach and Partnership Development
Parks Advocate (Internal Investigative Officer)
Assistant Commissioner for Communications
Assistant Commissioner for Diversity, Equity, Inclusion, and Belonging
Inspector General, assigned by the New York City Department of Investigation
First Deputy Commissioner
Deputy Commissioner/Chief Operating Officer
Assistant Commissioner for Citywide Operations
Assistant Commissioner for Forestry, Horticulture, and Natural Resources
Bronx Parks Borough Commissioner
Brooklyn Parks Borough Commissioner
Manhattan Parks Borough Commissioner
Queens Parks Borough Commissioner
Staten Island Parks Borough Commissioner
Deputy Commissioner for Capital Projects
Assistant Commissioner for Architecture and Engineering Program Management
Assistant Commissioner for Landscape Program Management
Deputy Commissioner, Urban Park Service and Public Programs
Assistant Commissioner for Public Programs 
Assistant Commissioner for Urban Park Service
Deputy Commissioner for Administration/Chief Administrative Officer
Assistant Commissioner for Budget and Fiscal Management
Assistant Commissioner for Innovation and Performance Management
Deputy Commissioner of Planning and Development
Assistant Commissioner for Concessions and Internal Audit

Park law enforcement

The department maintains an enforcement division, called the Parks Enforcement Patrol (PEP), responsible for maintaining safety and security within the parks system. Parks Enforcement Patrol officers have peace officer status under NYS Penal Law and are empowered through this status to make arrests and issue tickets. PEP officers patrol land, waterways and buildings under the jurisdiction of the Department of Parks and Recreation on foot, bicycle, horseback, boat and marked patrol trucks. PEP officers are also responsible for physical site inspections of NYC park concession facilities to assure the concessionaires compliance with state laws.

Urban Park Rangers
The Urban Park Rangers was founded as a pilot program in 1979 by then Parks Commissioner Gordon J. Davis, with the support and encouragement of Mayor Ed Koch. The program provides many free programs year-round, such as nature walks and activities. They also operate programs such as The Natural Classroom for class trips and the general public alike. "Explorer" programs are available for activities such as canoeing in the city's flagship parks in all five boroughs. NYC Urban Park Rangers are easily identified by their uniforms.

Although NYC Park Rangers possess peace officer status, their primary mission is environmental education, protection of park resources, and visitor safety. Law enforcement in city parks is the responsibility of the New York City Police Department, and Parks Enforcement Patrol officers.

Community Parks Initiative
The Community Parks Initiative was launched in 2014 and is providing $318 million of capital funding to improve more than 60 parks mainly located in densely populated neighborhoods where there are significant rates of poverty. The park improvements, such as Ranaqua Park in the South Bronx, consist of playground equipment, lighting, seating areas, water fountains, synthetic turn fields, trees and greenery, and rain gardens to collect storm water. The Longfellow Park renovation, also in the Bronx, is budgeted at $3.25 million and includes tree houses for children, bike racks, a sprinkler system for summer recreation, and a mini-state.

Public-private partnerships
The New York City Department of Parks and Recreations maintains facilities and provides services through a network of public service workers, volunteers, and partnerships with private organizations.

The momentum for private partnerships increased dramatically during the mayoralty of Michael Bloomberg. Often the initiatives of Parks Commissioner Adrian Benepe were controversial.

Concessions
Most businesses that operate or generate revenue on New York City parkland are considered concessions and must obtain a permit or license from the Revenue Division of Parks. Pursuant to the City's Concession Rules, these licenses and permits are generally awarded through a public solicitation process, such as a Request for Bids (RFB) or Request for Proposals (RFP).

Approximately 500 concessions currently operate in parks throughout the five boroughs, and they generally fall into two categories: food service and recreation. The food service concessions range from pushcarts selling hot dogs to restaurants such as Tavern on the Green and Terrace on the Park. Recreational concessions include facilities such as ice rinks, stables, marinas, and golf courses. In fiscal year 2009, NYC Parks' Revenue Division helped collect over $110 million in revenue from various sources including concessions, lease agreements, like those for Citi Field and Yankee Stadium, special events, and dockage.

Private partnerships
At the turn of the 20th century most of the staffing of New York City parks were patronage jobs. In the 1950s and 1960s, public sector unions organized most park workers which was considered at the time the first major political defeat of Robert Moses. During the city's fiscal crisis in the 1970s, the Department of Parks and Recreation City adapted practices such as using welfare recipients and volunteers to do work previously completed by unionized workers and to forge partnerships with nonprofit organizations and local sports leagues. Yorkville Sports (YSA) was one of those that helped maintain athletic fields prior to use and assumed responsibilities previously handled by the public sector. 
During this time the Central Park Conservancy and the Prospect Park Alliance were formed.

List of Park Commissioners
Since 1934, when New York City Parks Department Commissioners were unified, the directors have been:

See also 
 New York City Office of Administrative Trials and Hearings (OATH), for hearings conducted on summonses for quality of life violations issued by the Department
 List of New York City parks
 List of privately owned public spaces in New York City
 New York State Office of Parks, Recreation and Historic Preservation

References

External links

Parks History
Interactive Park Map of New York City
 Department of Parks and Recreation in the Rules of the City of New York

 
Department
1910 establishments in New York City
Trees of New York City